Crouch is a family name. It is an Anglo-Saxon name and derives from someone who lived by a cross.

People with the family name Crouch
 Andraé Crouch (1942–2015), American gospel musician
 Anna Maria Crouch (1763–1805), English actress and mistress of George, Prince of Wales
 Bill Crouch (1910s pitcher)
 Bill Crouch (1940s pitcher)
 Blake Crouch (born 1978), American author
 Colin Crouch, British professor of sociology
David Crouch British politician
David Crouch (historian) Medieval historian
 Dennis Crouch (born 1975), American legal academic best known as author of patent law blog Patently-O
 Dennis Crouch (bassist) (born 1967), American upright bassist 
 Eliza Emma Crouch (1836–1886), birth name of English courtesan Cora Pearl
 Eric Crouch, American football player
 Frederick Crouch, English composer and cellist
 Gabriel Crouch, English baritone and former member of King's Singers
 Jack Crouch (disambiguation), multiple people
 Jan Crouch, wife of Paul Crouch, and co-founder of Trinity Broadcasting Network
 Jared Crouch, Australian rules football player
 John Crouch (disambiguation), multiple people
 Lionel Crouch (1886–1916), British solicitor
 Leonard C. Crouch (1866–1953), New York judge
 Nigel Crouch, English footballer
 Paul Crouch, (1934–2013) founder of the largest Christian Television Network, Trinity Broadcasting Network
 Paul Crouch Jr. (born 1959), American Christian broadcaster
 Peter Crouch (born 1981), English footballer
 Robert Crouch (1904–1957) British Member of Parliament
 Roger K. Crouch, US payload specialist, with considerable space flight experience
 Sandra Crouch, US gospel musician
 Stanley Crouch (1945–2020), American music critic
 Suzanne Crouch, representative in the Indiana House of Representatives
 Tracey Crouch, British Conservative Member of Parliament

Fictional
 Barty Crouch Senior, fictional character in the Harry Potter series by J. K. Rowling
 Barty Crouch Jr., fictional character in the Harry Potter series by J. K. Rowling

See also 
 Cross (surname)
 Croucher

References